Common Courage Press is a book publishing company based in Monroe, Maine.

The company was formed in January 1990, in part by Greg Bates, who also serves as publisher. Bates explained his goal of the company: "by publishing books for social justice, Common Courage Press helps progressive ideas to find a place in our culture. The press provides a platform to spread these ideas to activists and ordinary citizens alike."

Ralph Nader praised Common Courage Press in 1997, proclaiming it "exists because too often the major publishers of books do not have common courage or have convinced themselves that 'courageous' books don't sell."

Selected publications 
 Blum, William. Killing Hope: U.S. Military and CIA Interventions Since World War II. Common Courage Press, 1995. 
 2nd edition, updated. Common Courage Press, 2004. , 
 Blum, William. Rogue State: A Guide to the World's Only Superpower. Common Courage Press, 2000. 
 Blum, William. Freeing the World to Death: Essays on the American Empire''. Common Courage Press, 2004.

External links 
 Archived website
 Book Depository
 Consortium Book Sales & Distribution
 OpenLibrary
 Full text of Rogue State.

References 

Publishing companies established in 1990
1990 establishments in Maine
Book publishing companies of the United States